Procalyptis parooptera is a species of moth of the family Tortricidae.

Description 
Procalyptis parooptera is found in Australia, where it has been recorded from Queensland.

The wingspan is 20.5-28 mm. The forewings are reddish brown with slightly darker transverse strigulae (fine streaks). The hindwings are greyish ochreous.

The larvae feed on the leaves of Ceriops species.

References

	

Moths described in 1925
Archipini